Marcin Jędrzejewski (born 10 April 1987 in Tuchola, Poland) is a Polish speedway rider and has ridden for the Polish national junior team. He has been riding since 2003.

Career details

World Championships 
 Individual U-21 World Championship
 2007 - 13th place in Semi-Final B
 2008 - 1st Track Reserve in Qualifying Round 2 (0 heats)
 Team U-21 World Championship
 2005 - 2nd place in Semi-Final C (as Polish team II - track reserve)
 2007 - started in Semi-Final A only

European Championships
 Individual U-19 European Championship
 2005 -  Mšeno - 18th place (1 point as track reserve)
 2006 -  Goričan - 8th place (8 points)

Domestic competitions
 Individual Polish Championship
 2006 - 11th place in Quarter-Final B
 2009 - 17th place in Quarter-Final 1 as track reserve
 Individual U-21 Polish Championship
 2005 - 4th place (10+2 points as track reserve)
 2006 - 10th place (6 points)
 2007 - 16th place (1 point)
 2008 - Rybnik - 12th place (5 points)
 Polish Under-21 Pairs Championship
 2004 - 5th place (2 points)
 2005 - 6th place (4 points)
 2006 - Silver medal (10 points)
 Team Polish Championship
 2003 - Bronze medal with Polonia Bydgoszcz
 2004 - 5 place with Polonia Bydgoszcz
 2005 - Silver medal with Polonia Bydgoszcz
 2006 - Bronze medal Polonia Bydgoszcz
 Team U-21 Polish Championship
 2004 - 5th place (3 points)
 2005 - 4th place (3 points)
 2006 - 2nd place in Qualification Group C
 2007 - Last round in Qualification Group A will be on September 15
 Silver Helmet (U-21)
 2006 - 11th place (5 points)
 2007 - Winner (15 points)
 2008 -  Rzeszów - 7th place (9 points)
 Bronze Helmet (U-19)
 2004 - 12th place in Semi-Final B
 2005 - Bronze medal (11 points)
 2006 - Bronze medal (12+2+2+1 points)

See also
Polish national speedway team

External links

 

Polish speedway riders
1987 births
Living people
Polonia Bydgoszcz riders
People from Tuchola